Vaughn Frederick Bishop is an American intelligence officer and former Deputy Director of the Central Intelligence Agency (CIA) appointed by President Donald Trump. Bishop first joined the CIA in 1981, and retired in 2011. He returned to the CIA four years later to serve as CIA Ombudsman for Analytic Objectivity during the Agency's modernization effort.

Education
Bishop earned a bachelor's degree in political science from Northwestern University in 1968, a master's degree in 1970, and a doctorate in Political Science and African Studies in 1974. Before he joined the CIA, Bishop served as an Assistant Professor of Political Science at Emory University in Atlanta, Georgia.

CIA career
Bishop joined the CIA in 1981. In the early 1990s, he led the CIA's Somalia Task Force. From 1996 to 1999 he served as Chief of Station, where he focused on building key partnerships to counter terrorism. From 1999 to 2001 he was the CIA's representative to PACOM. He also led the CIA's analytic efforts in Asia, Latin America, and Africa. From 2006 to 2009 he was responsible for forming a critical analytics partnership with a major ally. Bishop was then asked to serve as National Intelligence Officer for Africa. He rose to become the Vice Chairman of the National Intelligence Council in 2010. He retired from the CIA in 2011.

Personal life
Bishop is married and has two children. He is also a grandfather.

References

Year of birth missing (living people)
Deputy Directors of the Central Intelligence Agency
Living people
Northwestern University alumni
People of the Central Intelligence Agency
Emory University faculty